The 1948 Soviet football championship was the 16th seasons of competitive football in the Soviet Union and the 10th among teams of sports societies and factories. CDKA Moscow won the championship becoming the Soviet domestic champions for the third time straight and the first to win a league title three years in the row.

The defending champions CDKA as in the previous season allowed their main rivals Dinamo to take lead early in the season and managed to catch up only at the end defeating them in the last game of the season 3–2 to preserve their title.

Honours

Notes = Number in parentheses is the times that club has won that honour. * indicates new record for competition

Soviet Union football championship

First Group

Second Group

Subgroup Center

Subgroup Russia West

Subgroup Russia East

Subgroup Ukraine A

Subgroup Ukraine B

Subgroup Ukraine Final

1st place play-off
Lokomotiv Kharkov v Stal Dnepropetrovsk 3–1

Subgroup South (Caucasus)

Central Asia

Tier final

Top goalscorers

1st Group
Sergei Solovyov (Dinamo Moscow) – 25 goals

References

External links
 1948 Soviet football championship. RSSSF